"Friends" is a song written by Jerry Holland, and recorded by American country music artist John Michael Montgomery.  It was released in September 1996 as the second single from his album What I Do the Best.  It peaked at number 2 in the United States, while it was a number-one hit in Canada.

Content
The song is a ballad, that discusses how when people break up, they always state the line "we can still be friends."

Critical reception
Deborah Evans Price, of Billboard magazine reviewed the song favorably saying that "Montgomery's performance is solid, and the song is incredibly poignant."

Chart positions

Year-end charts

References

1996 songs
John Michael Montgomery songs
1997 singles
Atlantic Records singles